The 1894 Edmonton municipal election was held January 2, 1894 to elect the town council, consisting of a mayor and six aldermen, each elected for a one-year term.

The mayor was elected through First past the post; the aldermen were elected through Plurality block voting, with each voter able to cast as many as six votes. 175 voters voted, casting about 800 votes for aldermen.

Voter turnout
Voter turnout was 175 out of 240 eligible voters, or 72.9%.

Results
(bold indicates elected, italics indicate incumbent)

Mayor

Aldermen

References

City of Edmonton: Edmonton Elections

1894
1894 elections in Canada
1894 in Alberta
January 1894 events